The Rossanderska kursen ("Rossander Course"), also called Fröknarna Rossanders lärokurs för fruntimmer ("The Miss' Rossander Courses"), and Jenny Rossanders Lärokurs för fruntimmer ("Jenny Rossander's Learning Course for Women"), was a female seminary in Stockholm, Sweden in 1865-1882. It played an important part in the history of the developing women's education in contemporary Sweden.

History
In 1859, the  Lärokurs för fruntimmer ("Learning Course for Women") was founded in Stockholm after the Herthadiskussionen ("Hertha Discussion"), about women's legal status and right to education which was caused by Fredrika Bremer's novel Hertha. The courses proved so popular that a permanent Female seminary, the Royal Seminary, was founded in 1861, employing many of the teachers of the Learning Course.

In 1865, the Rossanderska kursen or Rossander Course was founded, inspired by its predecessor. The Rossander Course was founded by the sisters Jenny Rossander (1837-1887) and Alida Rossander (1843-1909), and named after them. Jenny Rossander was a personal friend of Fredrika Bremer and a contributor of the  Tidskrift för hemmet, were she agitated in favor of the view that education for women would benefit society when they became mothers and raised their children: Alida Rossander was a pioneer as the first female bank official when she became employed at the Stockholms Enskilda Bank the year prior.

The Rossander Course was organized in the same manner as its predecessor and role model, Learning Course for Women. The school was ruled by a board composed of Rossander, Fredrika Limnell, Anna Wallenberg and the noblewoman Ebba Lind af Hageby. Among its teachers were some of the teachers previously engaged at the Learning Course for Women and Royal Seminary, such as professor Alfred Fock, Louise Sundén, Ebba Gregerson, professor Lorentz Dietrichson, Frans Hultman, doctor Christian Lovén, Emil Key as well as the Rossander sisters themselves. 
The subjects were the same as in the Learning Course for Women: religion, natural science, mathematics, history, grammar, literature, French, personal hygiene, and drawing, but in contrast to its predecessor, it also offered language, which had been excluded by Learning Course for Women because it was the only serious subject normally provided by conventional girl schools. The students were divided in "students" (who studied with the purpose of graduating) and "listeners" (who wished to hear the lectures for recreational reasons), and the method of education were lectures, home assignments and interrogations. The course was almost free, with only an almost symbolic fee, used to finance the upkeep of the localities.

The Rossander Course was popular and mentioned as a valuable opportunity for adult women to complete their education, particularly female teachers. Many students were to become well known figures in Swedish society, such as the feminist Ellen Key, the educators Eugenie Steinmetz, Hilda Myrberg and Hildur Djurberg, and the suffragist Anna Whitlock.

In 1879, Jenny Rossander married the Swiss doctor baron Friedrich von Tschudi and left the school, but her sister Alida Rossander managed the school until it was closed in 1882.

References
 Heckscher, Ebba, Några drag ur den svenska flickskolans historia: under fleres medverkan samlade, Norstedt & söner, Stockholm, 1914
 Ulf Wittrock: Ellen Keys väg från kristendom till livstro, Appelberg, 1953
 Ronny Ambjörnsson: Ellen Key: En europeisk intellektuell

1865 establishments in Sweden
1882 disestablishments in Europe
Former women's universities and colleges
Defunct universities and colleges in Sweden
Educational institutions established in 1865
Educational institutions disestablished in 1882
Higher education in Stockholm
History of women in Sweden